The Men's time trial of the 2012 UCI Road World Championships cycling event took place on 19 September 2012 in Limburg, Netherlands.

Tony Martin defended his title by one of the smallest margins in the history of the event. On his ride he caught up and overtook Alberto Contador who started two minutes ahead.

Route
The riders completed a course that was  starting from Heerlen and finishing in Valkenburg. There were three named climbs including the famous Cauberg that features in the Amstel Gold Race.

Final classification

References

External links

Men's time trial
UCI Road World Championships – Men's time trial